This Is Football is a sports video game developed by SCE Studios Soho and published by Sony Computer Entertainment only in Europe exclusively for PlayStation. The game carries a licence from FIFPro allowing the inclusion of 30,000 real-life players and features English-language commentary from Clive Tyldesley.

Development
The game was developed by Sony Computer Entertainment Europe subsidiary studio Team Soho. Motion capture was carried out at the facilities of Aston Villa FC using an Oxford Metrics 370E system. Commentary comes from ITV's Clive Tyldesley.

Reception
Steve Owen gave a mixed review of the game for Official UK PlayStation Magazine, criticising the control system and some of the AI behaviour while praising the overall presentation of the game and the quality of the animation, awarding it a score of 7 out of 10 but noting "with FIFA and ISS Pro on offer, TIF only scrapes into third place".

References

External links

1999 video games
Association football video games
Europe-exclusive video games
Multiplayer and single-player video games
PlayStation (console) games
PlayStation (console)-only games
Sony Interactive Entertainment games
This Is Football
Video games developed in the United Kingdom
Team Soho games